Barambah is a rural locality in the Gympie Region, Queensland, Australia. In the  Barambah had a population of 46 people.

History 

In July 1906, 32 allotments were advertised for selection by the Department of Public Lands Office. The map advertising the land selection states the allotments are portions in the Parishes of Murgon, Goomeribong and Barambah. The portions were left over from 5 April 1906.

In the  Barambah had a population of 46 people.

Heritage listings 
Barambah has a number of heritage-listed sites, including:
 Goomeri Road: Barambah Homestead

References

External links 

Gympie Region
Localities in Queensland